The action of 18 October 1806 was a minor naval engagement during the Napoleonic Wars, fought between the British Royal Navy frigate HMS Caroline and a Dutch squadron at the entrance to Batavia harbour on Java in the Dutch East Indies. During the battle the Dutch frigate Maria Riggersbergen was left unsupported by the remainder of the squadron and, isolated, was forced to surrender. Captain Peter Rainier, the British commander, was subsequently free to remove his prize from within sight of the Dutch port when the remainder of the Dutch squadron refused to engage Caroline and their crews deliberately grounded the ships to avoid capture. He also returned many prisoners taken previously in a captured brig.

The action, and the earlier Action of 26 July 1806, demonstrated the weakness of the Dutch squadron in the East Indies and convinced Rear-Admiral Sir Edward Pellew to lead an operation against Batavia to eliminate the remainder of the Dutch squadron in November 1806. This second raid was only partially successful, and was followed a year later by a raid on the harbour of Griessie, in which the last Dutch warships in the East were eliminated.

Background
By 1806, the French squadron under Rear-Admiral Charles Linois departed for the Atlantic Ocean and a British expeditionary force captured the Cape of Good Hope. Rear-Admiral Sir Edward Pellew, commander of the British Royal Navy in the eastern half of the Indian Ocean at Madras in British India in the eastern half of the Indian Ocean was now able to concentrate on a major threat to British shipping in the region; the Dutch squadron based in the Dutch East Indies, specifically on Java at the port of Batavia.

The Dutch squadron, which consisted of a number of old ships of the line, three frigates and a number of smaller warships, was primarily an anti-piracy force. However, their presence so close to the Straits of Malacca, a major British trade route, was of concern to Pellew, particularly following the Battle of Pulo Aura in 1804, when Linois's squadron intercepted a vital British convoy in the Strait, using Batavia both as a base to launch the operation and repair damage afterwards. Determined to eliminate the Dutch squadron, Pellew despatched frigates to the region in the spring of 1806, under orders to disrupt trade and reconnoitre the Dutch harbours and bases. In July 1806, the frigate HMS Greyhound cruised the Molucca Islands, and captured a Dutch frigate and convoy at the action of 26 July 1806 off Celebes, encouraging further expeditions. In October 1806, a second frigate, the 36-gun HMS Caroline under Captain Peter Rainier (nephew of Admiral Peter Rainier whom Pellew had replaced), cruised in the Java Sea. Caroline had a successful start to the operation, discovering that the Dutch ships of the line had left Batavia harbour and sailed eastwards. He had also captured a number of Dutch ships so that by mid-October 57 of Rainier's crew, more than a fifth, were aboard prizes on the journey back to India, leaving Caroline with just 204 men and a large number of prisoners carried below decks.

Battle
On 18 October, Rainier was cruising in the Java Sea when he encountered and captured a small Dutch brig sailing from Bantam. From prisoners removed from this ship, Rainier learned that the Dutch frigate Phoenix was undergoing repairs at the small island of Onrust in the Thousand Islands. Deciding that Phoenix was lying in an exposed position and could be easily attacked, Rainier sailed Caroline towards Onrust, but was spotted in the passage between Middlebey and Amsterdam Islands by two small Dutch warships. Rainier attacked the small vessels, seizing the 14-gun brig Zeerop without a shot fired. The other vessel Zee-Ploeg escaped into shallow coastal waters, where the deeper drafted frigate could not follow.  The delay allowed Phoenix to sail to Batavia ahead of Caroline's pursuit.

As Caroline neared Batavia, Phoenix entered the well-defended harbour, making further pursuit impossible. However, Rainier then sighted a second frigate, lying at anchor in Batavia Roads, accompanied only by the 14-gun corvette William, the elusive brig Zee-Ploeg, and the 18-gun ship Patriot that belonged to the Dutch East India Company. Prisoners from Zeerop identified this ship as the 36-gun Maria Riggersbergen under Captain Claas Jager. Although this force was significantly stronger than Caroline, and could call on the support of approximately 30 gunboats anchored closer inshore, Rainier immediately gave orders to advance on the Dutch frigate. In his preparations for battle, Rainier ordered that springs be placed on his anchor cables, giving his ship the ability to easily turn at anchor to face new threats once engaged with the Maria Riggersbergen.

As Caroline approached, Captain Jager ordered his men to open fire on the British frigate at extreme range, also calling on support from the other Dutch vessels anchored nearby. Jager responded, but the British fire was too strong and within half an hour the Dutch flag was struck. Taking possession of the Dutch frigate, Lieutenant Lemage discovered that 50 of the 270 men aboard had been killed or wounded and that the ship had suffered moderate damage to its masts and rigging. British casualties in the engagement were three killed outright and eighteen more wounded, six of whom subsequently died. Also killed were four Dutch prisoners who had been sheltering in the hold.

While Lemage was boarding Maria Riggersbergen, Rainier had turned his attention to the other ships in the bay. However the sea was shallow and crossed by shoals that prevented further advance without proper charts, which Caroline lacked. Although they had fired a number of shots at long range, the interference by the smaller Dutch vessels during the battle had been negligible. Following the surrender of Maria Riggersbergen, most of the shipping in the bay including all seven of the merchant vessels, the three small warships and Phoenix, had deliberately beached themselves to avoid capture. Abandoning the idea of further operations off Batavia as too risky, Rainier ordered his ships to sail, placing most of the Dutch prisoners, including the wounded and sick, into the first brig captured that morning and ordering the ship to return to Batavia as a cartel, with the officers placed under parole restrictions. With most of his prisoners removed, Rainier then ordered Maria Riggersbergen and Zeerop to return to Madras.

Aftermath
Rainier's action against what appeared to be superior power and numbers exposed the poor quality of the Dutch squadron at Batavia.  Pellew determined to make a decisive attack on the capital of the Dutch East Indies during 1806. In November he led a powerful squadron to the harbour, once again forcing the Dutch to their squadron ashore, where it was burnt by boarding parties led by Admiral Pellew's son, Captain Fleetwood Pellew. The following year, Admiral Pellew returned in search of the missing ships of the line, discovering them at Griessie and causing the Dutch to destroy them too. With the Dutch squadron eliminated, the threat to British trade routes was removed and attention returned to the French bases in the Indian Ocean, the British waiting until 1811 to force the surrender of the remaining Dutch colonies in the East Indies.

Maria Riggersbergen was recommissioned into the Royal Navy as HMS Java, under Captain George Pigot. In his report after the battle, Rainier described the Dutch frigate as "launched in 1800 and is a fast sailing ship". The  journey to Madras had revealed that she was in fact much older and very unstable at sea. Java and all hands disappeared six months later in a February 1807 hurricane in the west Indian Ocean while in convoy with the flagship of Sir Thomas Troubridge HMS Blenheim during a hurricane in the western Indian Ocean. Rainier remained in the Pacific for some time, capturing the valuable Spanish ship San Raphael in January 1807, but ultimately his career stalled on his return to Europe.

Notes

References

Bibliography
 
 
 
 
 
 

Naval battles involving the Netherlands
Naval battles involving the United Kingdom
Naval battles of the Napoleonic Wars
Conflicts in 1806
October 1806 events